The North Macedonia Billie Jean King Cup team represents North Macedonia in the Billie Jean King Cup tennis competition. It is governed by the Macedonian Tennis Federation.

History
North Macedonia competed in its first Fed Cup in 1995.  Their best result was earning promotion to Group I in 2000. Prior to 1992, Macedonian players represented Yugoslavia.

Players

See also
Fed Cup
North Macedonia Davis Cup team

External links

Billie Jean King Cup teams
Fed Cup
Fed Cup